Philip Sawyer (born 8 March 1947, London) is an English musician who was a member of the Spencer Davis Group in the 1960s and later recorded under the alias Beautiful World.

Biography
Sawyer who attended the Guildhall School of Music and Drama began his musical career as lead guitarist and vocalist in various bands (Les Fleur de Lys, The Cheynes, with a 15-year-old Mick Fleetwood on drums, and Shotgun Express which also included Fleetwood and an aspiring Rod Stewart). At the age of 18, he was one of the two replacements for Steve and Muff Winwood in the Spencer Davis Group, the other being another 18-year-old prodigy, Eddie Hardin. and featured on their album With Their New Face On which featured two minor hits in Time Seller and Mr Second Class and Don't Want You No More later covered by the Allman Brothers  Sawyer left the group after a year and was replaced by Ray Fenwick.

After working as a songwriter and record producer for various artists (Florie Palmer, Sandie Shaw) he began writing music for television and radio commercials, corporate films, documentaries and feature films.

Following the success of two songs Sawyer wrote for Timotei commercials in 1992, in 1993 he worked under the artistic name 'Beautiful World': the albums In Existence and Forever have been sold internationally.
The Beautiful World albums were regarded as New Age music, and featured vocalists such as Cori Josias, Ella Harper,
Russian Roulette (aka Rush Winters), Sawyer's former Shotgun Express colleague Beryl Marsden and Miriam Stockley amongst others.

Beautiful World Discography

Albums
 In Existence (1994)
 Forever (1996)
 In Existence [Re-Release Remastered] (2005)

Singles
 "Wonderful World" used in the Timotei Honey Shampoo advertisement. Vocals: Cori Josias & Ella Harper
 "In Existence" (1994), WEA – used in the Timotei Almond Milk advertisement
 "In the Beginning" (1993), Warner Music
 "I Know" (1994)
 "Love Is Everything" / "Africa" (1996), WEA
 "Children of the Future" (1996)

Videos
 In Existence (1994)
 Children of the Future (1996)

References

External links
 https://archive.today/20130419142605/http://www.air-edel.co.uk/representation/composers/27/phil-sawyer/
 Official Site
 
 BBC
 Earth Rhythms
 
 

1947 births
Living people
Musicians from London
New-age musicians
English songwriters
English record producers
British rhythm and blues boom musicians
The Spencer Davis Group members
Shotgun Express members